Da Youngsta's is an American rap group from Philadelphia, Pennsylvania, United States, that consisted of brothers Taji "Taj Mahal" Goodman (born February 23, 1977) and Qu'ran "Q-Ball" Goodman (March 24, 1978), and their cousin Tarik "Reek Geez" Dawson (February 22, 1976).

The group released four albums in four years, experiencing its greatest success with 1993's The Aftermath.

The group started in 1991 by Q-Ball's dad when Q-Ball was asked to rap a verse for "Somethin' 4 Da Youth" By "M.G." His dad liked his flow, so he called Taji to rap the second verse and they called their cousin "Tarik" and they formed the group in 1991. Their first album Somethin 4 Da Youngsta's, failed to make the charts, but their  second single "Pass Da Mic" made it to number 10.

In 1993 their second album, The Aftermath, made it to number 25 On Rap / R&B Charts with 3 singles, "Crewz Pop", "Iz U Wit Me" and "Wild Child". "Crewz Pop" Made To Number 3 On The Hot Rap Singles And "Iz U Wit Me" Made It Number 9, In 1994

The group dropped their 3rd Album No Mercy in 1994, The album made it to Number 45.  It had 2 singles, "Hip Hop Ride" and "Mad Props". "Hip Hop Ride" peaked at Number 21, and Mad Props made it to number 19.

In 1995 they dropped their last album I'll Make U Famous. This was the group's first album after being dropped by the record label, but the album failed to make it to the charts.  The album spawned 2 singles,  "I'll Make U Famous" And "Verbal Glock". "I'll Make U Famous" made it to Number 25.  
The group was to make another album, "Icons", but they split up in 1998.

Discography

Albums

Singles

References

External links
 Discogs entry

African-American musical groups
American hip hop groups
Musical groups from Philadelphia
East Coast hip hop groups
American musical trios
Family musical groups
Hardcore hip hop groups
Rappers from Philadelphia